Cephalochetus elegans is a species of rove beetles in the subfamily Paederinae. It is found in Sri Lanka.

References

External links 

 Calliderma elegans at insectoid.info

Beetles described in 1859
Paederinae
Insects of Sri Lanka